The 2012–13 Maltese First Division (also known as 2012–13 BOV 1st Division due to sponsorship reasons) began on 14 September 2012 and ended on 28 April 2013.

Participating teams
These teams will contest the 2012–13 Maltese First Division season:
 Birżebbuġa St. Peter's
 Dingli Swallows
 Gudja United
 Gżira United
 Lija Athletic
 Marsaxlokk
 Mqabba
 Naxxar Lions
 Pietà Hotspurs
 St. Andrews
 Vittoriosa Stars
 Żejtun Corinthians

Changes from previous season
 Melita and Rabat Ajax were promoted to the 2012–13 Maltese Premier League. They were replaced with Marsaxlokk and Mqabba, relegated from 2011–12 Maltese Premier League.
St. Patrick and St. George's were relegated to the 2012–13 Maltese Second Division. They were replaced with Gżira United and Gudja United, all promoted from 2011–12 Maltese Second Division.

Final league table

Results

Championship playoff

Top scorers

References

External links
  BOV First Division Kicks Off 
 Championship Decider
  Dingli Relegated 
 Mqabba Relegated 

Maltese First Division seasons
Malta
2